Jeff Jones (born Ivor Jeffrey Jones, 10 December 1941) is a Welsh former cricketer, who took forty-four wickets in fifteen Test matches for the England cricket team between 1964 and 1968.

Cricket writer, Colin Bateman remarked, "South Wales is hardly renowned for fast bowlers but in 1960 a powerfully built left-armer joined the Glamorgan staff and caused undiluted excitement.  Unassuming and popular, Jeff Jones introduced a destructive force into Glamorgan's cricket it had never seen before".

Life and career
Jones was born in Dafen, Carmarthenshire.  He was a left-arm fast bowler who in 1965 took five wickets before conceding a run against Leicestershire at Grace Road, finishing with 8 for 11. The consensus was that there was no faster bowler in county cricket at that time. His wickets did not always come cheaply, as Jones was prone to be erratic at times, but at his best he was a handful for any batsman.

In the 1965-66 Ashes series he was England's top wicket taker, with 15 (at 35.53), taking 6 for 118 in the Fourth Test. He made his highest Test score of 16 in the Third Test, adding 55 for the last wicket with David Allen. His most famous batting moment came in Georgetown, Guyana in 1967-68 when, batting at his usual position at number eleven, he played out the last over of the match bowled by Lance Gibbs, to ensure that England escaped from the match with a draw, to secure a 1-0 series win over the West Indies. This was to be his last Test, and his first-class career also finished in 1968, after an elbow injury ended his time prematurely at the age of 26.  He left cricket to find an occupation in brewing.

His son, Simon Jones, a right-arm fast bowler for Glamorgan, also played Test cricket for England.

References

External links
 

1941 births
Living people
England Test cricketers
Glamorgan cricketers
Welsh cricketers
Marylebone Cricket Club cricketers
International Cavaliers cricketers
A. E. R. Gilligan's XI cricketers
T. N. Pearce's XI cricketers